The following is a list of notable deaths in July 2021.

Entries for each day are listed alphabetically by surname. A typical entry lists information in the following sequence:
 Name, age, country of citizenship at birth, subsequent country of citizenship (if applicable), reason for notability, cause of death (if known), and reference.

July 2021

1
Louis Andriessen, 82, Dutch composer (La Commedia, Writing to Vermeer, Rosa – A Horse Drama).
Arazi, 32, American-bred French racehorse.
Noble Banadda, 46, Ugandan chemical engineer, COVID-19.
Theodore C. Bestor, 69, American anthropologist, cancer.
Christian Bottollier, 92, French footballer (FC Nancy).
Antonio Cantisani, 94, Italian Roman Catholic prelate, bishop and archbishop of Rossano-Cariati (1971–1980) and Catanzaro-Squillace (1980–2003).
Charles Capper, 76–77, American historian, complications from Parkinson's disease.
Josh Culbreath, 88, American hurdler, Olympic bronze medalist (1956).
Yury Dokhoian, 56, Russian chess grandmaster, COVID-19.
Shashi Bhushan Hazari, 55, Indian politician, Bihar MLA (since 2010), hepatitis B.
Harriet S. Iglehart, 94, American equestrian and writer, heart failure.
Anwar Iqbal, 71, Pakistani actor.
Steve Kekana, 62, South African singer, complications from COVID-19.
Evgenia Kirichenko, 90, Russian historian.
Farida Mansurova, 69, Tajikistani physician.
Mathew D. McCubbins, 64, American political scientist.
Sanghamitra Mohanty, 68, Indian computer scientist.
Asma Nabeel, Pakistani screenwriter (Khuda Mera Bhi Hai, Khaani), breast cancer.
Nyunt Win, 80, Burmese actor (Never Shall We Be Enslaved, Mystery of Snow).
Marcel Puget, 80, French rugby union player (CA Brive, national team), complications from Alzheimer's disease.
Ann Rinaldi, 86, American author (An Acquaintance with Darkness, A Break with Charity, Hang a Thousand Trees with Ribbons).
Philece Sampler, 67, American voice actress (Digimon Adventure, Miraculous: Tales of Ladybug & Cat Noir, The Legend of Korra), heart attack.
Greg Schaum, 67, American football player (Dallas Cowboys, New England Patriots).
Kartal Tibet, 82, Turkish actor (Tarkan Versus the Vikings) and film director (Tosun Paşa, Şalvar Davası).
Eric D. Weitz, 68, American historian.

2
Gerry Abel, 76, American ice hockey player (Detroit Red Wings).
Steve Arneil, 86, South African-English karateka.
Helmut Ashley, 101, Austrian cinematographer (Duel with Death, White Shadows, The Old Fox).
Juozas Baranauskas, 86, Lithuanian television broadcaster (LRT televizija) and politician, MP (1992–1996).
Mohamed Nejib Berriche, Tunisian politician, deputy (2004–2009), COVID-19.
Fereimi Cama, 66, Fijian Anglican prelate, bishop of Polynesia (since 2019).
Ion Ciocanu, 81, Moldovan literary critic.
Robert Correia, 82, American politician, member of the Massachusetts House of Representatives (1977–2008) and mayor of Fall River (2008–2010).
Eric Eldin, 88, British jockey.
Hazel Erby, 75, American politician, member of the St. Louis County Council (2004–2019), pancreatic cancer.
Margaret H. George, 93, American politician, member of the Pennsylvania House of Representatives (1977–1980) and author.
Naïm Kattan, 92, Iraqi-born Canadian novelist, essayist and critic.
Kōbō Kenichi, 47, Japanese sumo wrestler, COVID-19.
Ali Osman Khan, 74, Bangladeshi politician, MP (1979–1982).
Omar Lara, 80, Chilean poet and writer.
Miriam Laserson, 102, Russian-born American actress.
Elliot Lawrence, 96, American jazz pianist, nine-time Emmy award winner.
Lehlo Ledwaba, 49, South African boxer, IBF super bantamweight champion (1999–2001), COVID-19.
Andrew P. Miller, 88, American politician, attorney general of Virginia (1970–1977).
Mundardjito, 84, Indonesian archeologist, lung infection.
Jeffrey Northrup, 55, Canadian police officer, traffic collision.
Bill Ramsey, 90, German-American jazz singer and actor (Music in the Blood, The Adventures of Count Bobby, Old Shatterhand).
William Regnery II, 80, American white supremacy activist, founder of National Policy Institute.
B. M. Senguttuvan, 80, Indian politician, Tamil Nadu MLA (1996–2001).
Joyce Shrubbs, 94, British Royal Observer Corps officer.
Nikolai Slichenko, 86, Russian singer and actor (Hard Happiness, Wedding in Malinovka).
Manteb Soedharsono, 72, Indonesian wayang puppeteer, COVID-19.
Jolien Verschueren, 31, Belgian cyclo-cross racer (Pauwels Sauzen–Bingoal), brain cancer.
Lise Vidal, 43, French Olympic windsurfer (2000).
Giuliano Zoratti, 73, Italian football player (Pro Gorizia) and manager (Reggina, Avellino), cancer.

3
Abelardo Alvarado Alcántara, 87, Mexican Roman Catholic prelate, auxiliary bishop of Mexico (1985–2008).
Bob Beer, 79, Australian adventurer.
Nigel Brouwers, 44, South African cricketer (Eastern Province, Northerns, South Western Districts).
Purnell W. Choppin, 91, American virologist.
Desmond Davis, 95, British film director (Clash of the Titans, Girl with Green Eyes, I Was Happy Here).
Richard Domba Mady, 68, Congolese Roman Catholic prelate, bishop of Doruma-Dungu (since 1994).
Antony Eastman, 74, Indian film director (Ambada Njaane!), heart attack.
Nino Escalera, 91, Puerto Rican baseball player (Cincinnati Reds).
Franck Abd-Bakar Fanny, 50–51, Ivorian photographer.
Geoffrey Hutchinson, 87, Barbadian cricketer (national team).
He Kang, 98, Chinese politician, member of the CCP Central Committee (1982–1992) and minister of agriculture (1988–1990).
Kenneth John, 83, Vincentian lawyer and newspaper columnist.
James Kallstrom, 78, American FBI agent and television host (The FBI Files).
Nikolay Konstantinov, 89, Russian mathematician, COVID-19.
Galina Kostenko, 82, Russian Olympic high jumper (1964).
Samuel Luiz, 24, Spanish nursing assistant, beaten.
Naushad Merali, 70, Kenyan communications executive and property developer.
John Siffy Mirin, 42, Indonesian politician, MP (since 2018), COVID-19.
Waldemar Mühlbächer, 83, German footballer (BFC Dynamo, East Germany national team).
Patrick Murray, 76, English-born Australian Olympic sport shooter (1992, 1996).
Ted Nash, 88, American rower, Olympic champion (1960).
Maev O'Collins, 92, Australian social worker and academic.
Enzo Polidori, 84, Italian politician, mayor of Piombino (1976–1983).
Roberto Rodríguez, 85, Argentine Roman Catholic prelate, bishop of La Rioja (2006–2013), Villa María (1998–2006) and Pertusa (1992–1998), COVID-19.
Barbara Barnard Smith, 101, American ethnomusicologist.
Anne Stallybrass, 82, English actress (The Six Wives of Henry VIII, Heartbeat, Diana: Her True Story).
Rachmawati Sukarnoputri, 70, Indonesian politician, member of the Presidential Advisory Council (2007–2009), COVID-19.
Athan Theoharis, 84, American historian, pneumonia.
Haunani-Kay Trask, 71, American Hawaiian nationalist and author.

4
Burhan Abdurahman, 64, Indonesian politician, mayor of Ternate (2010–2015, 2016–2021), COVID-19.
Samuel Ankama, 63, Namibian politician, MP (since 2005), complications from COVID-19.
Edgar Bear Runner, 70, American indigenous activist.
Francesco Bosi, 76, Italian politician, senator (1996–2006) and mayor of Rio Marina (2001–2011).
Raymond Brousseau, 83, Canadian film director, screenwriter, and artist.
Sanford Clark, 85, American rockabilly singer ("The Fool", "Houston"), COVID-19.
Terry Donahue, 77, American Hall of Fame college football coach (UCLA Bruins) and executive (San Francisco 49ers), cancer.
Michel Dubois, 83, French theatre director.
Roza Eldarova, 97, Russian writer and politician, chairwoman of the Presidium of the Supreme Soviet of the Dagestan ASSR (1962–1967).
Maidarjavyn Ganzorig, 72, Mongolian cosmonaut, Soyuz 39 reserve pilot.
Igor Garnier, 31, Serbian disc jockey and music producer.
Luminița Gheorghiu, 71, Romanian actress (The Death of Mr. Lazarescu, Child's Pose, Code Unknown).
Abebech Gobena, 83, Ethiopian humanitarian, COVID-19.
Dennis Gorski, 76, American politician, member of the New York State Assembly (1975–1987), Erie County executive (1988–1999), complications from Parkinson's disease.
Laurence Harding-Smith, 91, Australian Olympic fencer (1956).
Harmoko, 82, Indonesian politician, minister of information (1983–1997), speaker of the DPR and MPR (1997–1999), progressive supranuclear palsy and COVID-19.
Anne H. Hopkins, 79, American academic administrator, president of the University of North Florida.
Matīss Kivlenieks, 24, Latvian ice hockey goaltender (Columbus Blue Jackets, national team), chest injuries from firework blast.
Rick Laird, 80, Irish jazz fusion bassist (Mahavishnu Orchestra, Brian Auger and the Trinity), lung cancer.
Richard Lewontin, 92, American evolutionary biologist.
Barbara J. Litrell, 77, American magazine publisher (McCall's, Working Mother, Working Woman), complications from breast cancer.
John McGrath, 81, Australian politician, Victoria MLA (1985–1999).
Dicky Moegle, 86, American football player (San Francisco 49ers, Pittsburgh Steelers, Dallas Cowboys).
Henry Parham, 99, American soldier, bladder cancer.
Muhammad Taha Al-Qaddal, 69, Sudanese poet.
Richard Rainey, 82, American politician, member of the California State Assembly (1992–1996) and Senate (1996–2000), melanoma.
Hans-Jürgen Ripp, 75, German footballer (Hamburger SV, Lüneburger SK).
Wolfgang Roth, 80, German politician, MP (1976–1993), vice president of the European Investment Bank (1993–2006).
Adang Sudrajat, 58, Indonesian politician, MP (since 2014), COVID-19.
Volodymyr Tyahlo, 74, Ukrainian politician, chairman of the Kharkiv Oblast Council (1992–1994, 1996–2002), ambassador to Armenia (2002–2005) and Kyrgyzstan (2005–2008).
Dale Whiteside, 90, American politician, member of the Missouri House of Representatives (1987–1997).

5
Fay Allen, 83, Jamaican-born British police officer.
Masood Ashar, 91, Pakistani writer.
Aggrey Awori, 82, Ugandan Olympic hurdler (1960, 1964), economist, and politician, MP (2001–2006), COVID-19.
Patrick Boré, 64, French politician, mayor of La Ciotat (2001–2020), senator (since 2020), cancer.
Raffaella Carrà, 78, Italian singer ("A far l'amore comincia tu"), actress (Caesar the Conqueror, Von Ryan's Express) and television presenter, lung cancer.
Didi Contractor, 91, Indo-American architect.
Roger Cudney, 85, American actor (On Wings of Eagles, Licence to Kill, Instructions Not Included), singer and dubbing director.
Richard Donner, 91, American film director (Superman, Lethal Weapon, The Goonies) and producer, heart failure.
Dom Flora, 85, American basketball player (Washington and Lee Generals, Akron Goodyear Wingfoots).
Franco Gallina, 76, Italian football player (Virtus Entella, Cesena, Genoa) and manager.
Roberto Hernández, 54, Cuban sprinter, Olympic silver medalist (1992), complications from cardiovascular disease.
Rubén Israel, 65, Uruguayan football manager (Rentistas, Club Libertad, Barcelona de Ecuador).
Heather Jansch, 72, British sculptor, stroke.
Michelle Jerott, 60, American author.
Leo van de Ketterij, 70, Dutch guitarist (Shocking Blue).
Władysław Lisewski, 73, Polish politician and engineer, mayor of Szczecin (1991–1994), voivode of Szczecin (1997–1998) and West Pomerania (1999–2001).
Vladimir Menshov, 81, Russian film director (Moscow Does Not Believe in Tears, Love and Pigeons) and actor (The General), COVID-19.
Alfredo Obberti, 75, Argentine footballer (Newell's Old Boys, Grêmio, national team).
José Secall, 72, Chilean actor (Feroz, Primera dama, Preciosas) and theater director.
Gillian Sheen, 92, British fencer, Olympic champion (1956).
William Smith, 88, American actor (Fast Company, Rumble Fish, Any Which Way You Can).
Stan Swamy, 84, Indian Roman Catholic Jesuit priest and tribal rights activist, complications from COVID-19 and Parkinson's disease.
Sergey Timofeyev, 71, Russian Olympic wrestler (1976).

6
Mohammad Izhar Alam, 72, Indian police officer, Punjab DGP.
Quentin Bone, 89, English marine biologist.
Arthur Brooks, 85, American politician, member of the Ohio House of Representatives (1975–1978).
Tom Buford, 72, American politician, member of the Kentucky Senate (since 1991).
Angelo Del Boca, 96, Italian historian.
Mike Delanty, 84, Australian footballer (Collingwood, North Melbourne).
Suzzanne Douglas, 64, American actress (The Parent 'Hood, How Stella Got Her Groove Back, When They See Us), cancer.
Mary Fama, 82, New Zealand mathematician, complications from bronchiectasis.
Djivan Gasparyan, 92, Armenian musician and composer.
Valerius Geist, 83, Ukrainian-born Canadian biologist.
Miguel González, 94, Spanish football player (Atlético Madrid, Real Zaragoza, national team) and coach.
Sir Nicholas Goodison, 87, British businessman, chairman of the London Stock Exchange (1976–1986).
Patrick John, 83, Dominican politician, premier (1974–1978) and prime minister (1978–1979).
Axel Kahn, 76, French geneticist, president of Paris Descartes University, cancer.
Harold Kalant, 97, Canadian pharmacologist and physician.
Ramadhar Kashyap, 57, Indian politician, MP (2002–2008), heart attack.
Marc Lamunière, 100, Swiss writer.
Walter Libuda, 71, German artist.
Colin McKee, 71, Australian politician, South Australia MHA (1989–1993).
Barry McKenzie, 75, Australian footballer (Fitzroy, West Torrens).
Montgomery Meigs, 76, American general, complications from Parkinson’s disease and Lewy body dementia.
Zenji Okuzawa, 83, Japanese Olympic runner (1964).
Leandro de Oliveira, 39, Brazilian track and field athlete.
William H. Pauley III, 68, American jurist, judge of the U.S. District Court for Southern New York (since 1998).
Jasti Eswara Prasad, 86, Indian jurist, judge of the Andhra Pradesh (1990–1994) and Karnataka High Courts (1994–1996), heart attack.
Nikolai Reznichenko, 69, Russian military officer, COVID-19.
Des Schonegevel, 86, South African cricketer (Orange Free State, Griqualand West).
Sheila Tobias, 86, American gender studies scholar.

7
Greg Clark, 49, American football player (San Francisco 49ers), suicide by gunshot.
Robert Downey Sr., 85, American film director (Putney Swope, Up the Academy) and actor (To Live and Die in L.A.), complications from Parkinson's disease.
Keshav Dutt, 95, Indian field hockey player, Olympic champion (1948, 1952).
Asela de Armas Pérez, 66, Cuban chess player, cancer.
Jose Jaime Espina, 59, Filipino journalist, liver cancer.
Anatoliy Franchuk, 85, Ukrainian politician, prime minister of Crimea (1994–1996, 1997–1998).
Józef Gałeczka, 82, Polish footballer (Piast Gliwice, Zagłębie Sosnowiec).
Erin Gilmer, 38, American disability activist and lawyer, suicide.
Bob F. Griffin, 85, American politician, member (1971–1996) and speaker (1981–1996) of the Missouri House of Representatives.
Karen Hastie Williams, 76, American lawyer, complications from frontotemporal dementia.
Martin Hebner, 61, German politician, MP (since 2017), brain cancer.
Allan Hobson, 88, American psychiatrist and dream researcher.
Michael Horovitz, 86, German-born British poet.
Smaïn Ibrir, 89, Algerian footballer (Le Havre AC, national team).
Angélique Ionatos, 67, Greek singer and composer.
Ahmed Jibril, 84, Palestinian militant, founder and leader of the PFLP-GC.
Dilip Kumar, 98, Indian actor (Andaz, Daag, Qila), MP (2000–2006), prostate cancer.
Kuo Jung-cheng, 71, Taiwanese politician, MLY (1999–2002), liver cancer.
Pierre Laffitte, 96, French politician and scientist, founder of Sophia Antipolis and senator (1985–2008).
Mihkel Leppik, 88, Estonian rowing coach.
Cameron Mackenzie, 60, South African politician, MP (since 2014), COVID-19.
Priscilla Johnson McMillan, 92, American historian and journalist.
Jovenel Moïse, 53, Haitian politician and entrepreneur, president (since 2017), shot.
Elystan Morgan, 88, Welsh politician, MP (1966–1974) and member of the House of Lords (1981–2020).
Dinah Murray, 75, British writer and autism advocate, pancreatic cancer.
Eddie Payne, 69, American college basketball coach (USC Upstate Spartans, Oregon State Beavers, East Carolina Pirates), stroke.
Donald Pippin, 95, American pianist and opera director.
Carlos Reutemann, 79, Argentine Formula One racing driver and politician, governor of Santa Fe Province (1991–1995, 1999–2003) and senator (since 2003), digestive hemorrhage.
Sherwin Siy, 40, American attorney.
Michael Soles, 54, Canadian football player (Edmonton Eskimos, Montreal Alouettes), complications from amyotrophic lateral sclerosis.
William Stevenson, 87, Canadian justice, judge of the Supreme Court of Canada (1990–1992).
Giovanni Tegano, 81, Italian mobster, head of De Stefano 'ndrina.
Giuseppe Tesauro, 78, Italian jurist, president of the Constitutional Court (2014) and advocate general of the European Court of Justice (1988–1998).
Chick Vennera, 74, American actor (Thank God It's Friday, Animaniacs, The Milagro Beanfield War), cancer.
Ted Wieand, 88, American baseball player (Cincinnati Reds).
Herman Willemse, 87, Dutch long-distance swimmer.
Paul C. Weiler, 82, Canadian legal scholar.
Chris Youngblood, 55, American professional wrestler (WWC, FMW, AJPW).

8
Hossam Mohammed Amin, 71, Iraqi general, COVID-19.
Paul Birckel, 82, Canadian businessman and indigenous leader, chief of the Champagne and Aishihik First Nations (1978–1998).
Ramesh Borde, 69, Indian cricketer (West Zone).
Jan Caliński, 72, Polish football manager (Śląsk Wrocław).
Came Home, 22, American racehorse.
Jack Cookson, 92, Canadian politician, Alberta MLA (1971–1982) and minister of the environment (1979–1982).
Ricardo Costa, 81, Portuguese filmmaker and producer.
Giorgos Dalakouras, 83, Greek politician, MP (1974–1981), MEP (1981), and civil administrator of Mount Athos (2004–2010).
Max Griggs, 82, English footwear and football executive, owner of Dr. Martens and Rushden & Diamonds F.C.
M. Frederick Hawthorne, 92, American inorganic chemist.
Walter Thomas McGovern, 99, American jurist, judge (since 1971) and chief judge (1975–1987) of the U.S. District Court for Western Washington.
Adrian Metcalfe, 79, British sprinter, Olympic silver medalist (1964).
Brian Osborne, 81, English actor (Upstairs, Downstairs, The Sandbaggers).
Abul Kalam Qasmi, 70, Indian Urdu critic.
Sam Reed, 85, American jazz saxophonist.
Rachhpal Singh, 78, Indian politician, West Bengal MLA (since 2011).
Virbhadra Singh, 87, Indian politician, four-time chief minister of Himachal Pradesh and MP (1962–1977, 1980–1984, 2009–2014), complications from COVID-19.
Bryan Watson, 78, Canadian ice hockey player (Detroit Red Wings, Pittsburgh Penguins, Washington Capitals).

9
Boris Andreyev, 80, Russian cosmonaut.
Matthew Cao Xiangde, 93, Chinese Roman Catholic priest, unmandated archbishop of Hangzhou (since 2000).
Jonathan Coleman, 65, English-born Australian radio and television presenter, prostate cancer.
Frank Cook, 79, American drummer (Canned Heat, Pacific Gas & Electric) and psychologist.
Þórunn Egilsdóttir, 56, Icelandic politician, MP (since 2013), breast cancer.
Dawn Foster, 34, British journalist (The Independent, Tribune, The Guardian) and broadcaster.
Betty Gilderdale, 97, British-born New Zealand children's author.
Mirza Abdul Halim, 93, Bangladeshi politician, MP (1979–1986).
Pentti Isotalo, 94, Finnish Olympic ice hockey player (1952) and referee (1964).
George Johnson, 103, American Air Force major general.
Wesley Momo Johnson, 77, Liberian politician, diplomat, and athlete.
Vladimir Karasev, 83, Russian chess player.
Gian Franco Kasper, 77, Swiss sports executive, president of the International Ski Federation (1998–2021).
Peter Kopelman, 70, British academic administrator, interim vice-chancellor of the University of London (2018–2019), leukemia.
Ngaire Lane, 95, New Zealand Olympic swimmer (1948).
Joan Le Mesurier, 90, English actress and author.
Frank Lui, 85, Niuean politician, premier (1993–1999), member of the Assembly (1963–1966, 1969–1999).
Geoff Makhubo, 53, South African politician, mayor of Johannesburg (since 2019), complications from COVID-19.
Paul Mariner, 68, English football player (Plymouth Argyle, Ipswich Town, national team) and manager, brain cancer.
George Rhoads, 95, American sculptor and painter (Archimedean Excogitation).
Emma Ritch, 44, Scottish equality activist.
Jehan Sadat, 87, Egyptian human rights activist, first lady (1970–1981), cancer.
Ken Thomas, British record producer. (death announced on this date)

10
Esther Béjarano, 96, German singer (Women's Orchestra of Auschwitz) and Holocaust survivor, co-founder of the International Auschwitz Committee.
Byron Berline, 77, American fiddler, complications from a stroke.
Carmel Budiardjo, 96, British human rights activist, founder of Tapol.
David Carter, 67, American football player (Houston Oilers, New Orleans Saints).
Homen D' Wai, 51, Indian film director and scriptwriter (Yaiskulgee Pakhang Angaoba, VDF Thasana, Ei Actor Natte), COVID-19.
Jean-Michel Dubernard, 80, French surgeon and politician, deputy (1986–2007), heart attack.
Gwendolyn Faison, 96, American politician, mayor of Camden, New Jersey (2000–2010).
Travis Fulton, 44, American mixed martial artist, suicide by hanging.
Jimmy Gabriel, 80, Scottish football player (Everton, Southampton, national team) and manager.
Galileo, 23, Irish racehorse and sire.
Anne Paradise Hansford, 96, American basketball player.
Ron Hutchinson, 84, Canadian ice hockey player (New York Rangers).
Sonny Jackson, 82, American college football coach (Nicholls Colonels, McNeese State Cowboys).
Tadeusz Lewandowski, 77, Polish politician and trade union activist, deputy (1991–1993) and senator (1997–2001, 2005–2007).
Kathi Mahesh, 43, Indian film critic and actor (Hrudaya Kaleyam, Nene Raju Nene Mantri, Kobbari Matta), respiratory failure.
Jean-Claude Malbet, 83, French rugby union player (Agen, national team).
Jeff Manookian, 67, American pianist and composer, complications from lymphoma.
Mandy Martin, 68, Australian artist, cancer.
Syd Nelson, 88, American politician, member of the Minnesota House of Representatives (1991–1994).
Natale Nobili, 85, Italian football player (S.P.A.L., Pro Vercelli, Alessandria) and coach.
Dave O'Neal, 84, American politician, lieutenant governor of Illinois (1977–1981).
Joachim Sauter, 62, German media artist and designer.
Dick Tidrow, 74, American baseball player (New York Yankees, Chicago Cubs, Cleveland Indians), World Series champion (1977, 1978).
P. K. Warrier, 100, Indian Ayurveda practitioner.

11
Philippe Aigrain, 71, French computer scientist.
Eka Supria Atmaja, 48, Indonesian politician, vice-regent (2017–2019) and regent (since 2019) of Bekasi, COVID-19.
Yusuf Barnabas Bala, 64, Nigerian politician, deputy governor of Kaduna State (2015–2019).
Juini Booth, 73, American jazz double-bassist.
Filippo Cavazzuti, 79, Italian economist and politician, senator (1983–1996).
George Ciamba, 55, Romanian diplomat.
Michael Cullimore, 84, British watercolour artist.
Jordi Cussà, 60, Spanish writer and stage actor.
Dave Dunmore, 87, English footballer (Leyton Orient, York City, Tottenham Hotspur).
Tomio Fujii, 96, Japanese politician, member of the Tokyo Metropolitan Assembly (1963–2005).
Charlie Gallagher, 80, Scottish-Irish footballer (Celtic, Dumbarton, Ireland national team).
Van A. Harvey, 95, Chinese-born American theologian and religious academic.
Jerzy Janeczek, 77, Polish actor (Sami swoi, The Hourglass Sanatorium, Nie ma mocnych).
Henryk Kowalski, 87, Polish racing cyclist.
Jeci Lapus, 68, Filipino engineer and politician, member of the House of Representatives (2007–2013), heart attack.
Ernie Moss, 71, English footballer (Chesterfield, Mansfield Town, Lincoln City).
Anastasios Nerantzis, 76, Greek attorney and politician, member (1974–2014) and speaker (2007–2009) of the Hellenic Parliament.
Colette O'Neil, 85, Scottish actress (Coronation Street, Doctor Who, The Spoils of War).
Frank D. Padgett, 98, American jurist, associate justice of the Supreme Court of Hawaii (1982–1992).
Laurent Monsengwo Pasinya, 81, Congolese Roman Catholic cardinal, archbishop of Kisangani (1988–2007) and Kinshasa (2007–2018).
George Petersen, 87, New Zealand biochemist.
Attilio Prior, 86, Italian footballer (Vicenza).
Charlie Robinson, 75, American actor (Night Court, Sugar Hill, The Black Gestapo), complications from cancer.
Reynold Ruffins, 90, American painter.
Renée Simonot, 109, French actress.
Doug J. St. Onge, 87, American politician, member of the Minnesota House of Representatives (1973–1979, 1983–1985).
Jerry Steele, 82, American basketball coach (Guilford Quakers, Carolina Cougars, High Point Panthers).
Sound Sultan, 44, Nigerian rapper, AITL.
John T. Traynor, 94, American politician, member of the North Dakota Senate (1991–2006).
Oleg Tselkov, 86, Russian nonconformist artist.
Joop Voorn, 88, Dutch composer.
Jack Windsor Lewis, 94, British phonetician.

12
Luisa Adorno, 99, Italian writer and teacher.
Mohammed bin Ismail Al Amrani, 99, Yemeni judge and Islamic scholar.
Mick Bates, 73, English footballer (Leeds United, Walsall, Bradford City).
Włodzimierz Borodziej, 64, Polish historian.
Francisco Caló, 74, Portuguese footballer (Sporting, Tomar, national team).
Tom F. Driver, 96, American theologian.
Edwin Edwards, 93, American politician, member of the U.S. House of Representatives (1965–1972) and three-time governor of Louisiana, respiratory failure.
Bertram Firestone, 89, American industrial real estate developer, thoroughbred breeder and horse owner (Genuine Risk).
John Fiske, 81, English media scholar and cultural theorist, complications from heart surgery.
Alex Gibbs, 80, American football coach (Denver Broncos, Atlanta Falcons), complications from a stroke.
Erich Hasenkopf, 86, Austrian footballer (Wiener Sport-Club, national team).
Wilson Jones, 87, Spanish footballer (Real Madrid, Real Zaragoza, Racing de Santander).
Paulo Tarso Flecha de Lima, 88, Brazilian diplomat.
Banduk Marika, 66, Australian indigenous artist and printmaker.
Seán McCarthy, 84, Irish politician, TD (1981–1989), minister of industry and commerce (1987–1989).
Nokuzola Mlengana, 58, South African actress.
Bob Nakata, 80, American politician, member of the Hawaii House of Representatives (1983–1987) and Senate (1999–2003).
Ben Ngubane, 79, South African politician, premier of KwaZulu-Natal (1997–1999), minister of arts and culture (1994–1996, 1999–2004), COVID-19.
Paul Orndorff, 71, American Hall of Fame professional wrestler (WWF, WCW, GCW), dementia.
Baselios Marthoma Paulose II, 74, Indian primate of the Malankara Orthodox Syrian Church, Catholicos of the East (since 2010), complications from COVID-19.
Joshua Perper, 88, Romanian-born American pathologist and toxicologist, chief medical examiner of Broward County, Florida (1994–2011).
Ladislav Potměšil, 75, Czech actor (Forbidden Dreams, Dobří holubi se vracejí, Byl jednou jeden polda), cancer.
Jean Pradel, 87, French jurist and professor.
John L. Rotz, 86, American Hall of Fame jockey.
Matti Saarinen, 74, Finnish politician, MP (1987–1991, 1995–2015), pancreatic cancer.
Marion Sarraut, 82, French film and television director (Catherine, Julie Lescaut).
Mahmoud Shakibi, 94, Iranian footballer (Shahin, national team), heart attack.
Wolfgang Weingart, 80, German graphic designer and typographer.
Xu Jingren, 76, Chinese pharmaceutical executive and politician, chairman of YRPG and delegate to the National People's Congress (since 2018).

13
Naveed Alam, 47, Pakistani Olympic field hockey player (1996), blood cancer.
Antonio Barrutia, 88, Spanish racing cyclist.
Brother Resistance, 66, Trinidadian rhythm poet and musician.
Cha Gi-suk, 34, South Korean footballer (Gyeongju Citizen, Bucheon FC 1995), kidney failure.
Susan Chitty, 91, English novelist.
Alberto Dualib, 101, Brazilian businessman and football executive, chairman of Sport Club Corinthians Paulista (1993–2007).
Abdul Dyer, 84, Pakistani cricketer (Karachi).
Shirley Fry, 94, American Hall of Fame tennis player.
Jorge J. E. Gracia, 78, Cuban-born American philosopher.
Ronnie Kavanagh, 90, Irish rugby union player (Wanderers, Leinster, national team).
Kumutha Rahman, 42, Malaysian politician, MP (2008–2013), COVID-19.
Jean-Jacques Reboux, 62, French writer, poet and editor.
Margaret Richardson, 78, American lawyer and public official, commissioner of internal revenue (1993–1997), complications from lung cancer.
Boris Rotman, 96, Chilean-American immunologist and molecular biologist. (death announced on this date)
Yashpal Sharma, 66, Indian cricketer (Punjab, Haryana, national team), World Cup champion (1983), heart attack.
Alexander Stefanovich, 76, Russian film director and screenwriter (Dusha, Start All Over Again), complications from COVID-19.

14
Sam Belnavis, 81, American automobile racing executive (NASCAR).
Christian Boltanski, 76, French sculptor, photographer and painter (Monument to the Lycée Chases).
Klaus Bringmann, 85, German historian.
Carol P. Christ, 75, American feminist historian and thealogian.
Igor Dzyaloshinskii, 80, Russian theoretical physicist.
Dan Forestal, 38, American politician, member of the Indiana House of Representatives (2012–2020).
Sally Miller Gearhart, 90, American novelist (The Wanderground) and feminist.
Yekutiel Gershoni, 78, Israeli historian and sprinter, Paralympic silver medallist (1980).
Ariel Goldenberg, 70, Argentine-born French theatre director.
Antonio Gómez del Moral, 81, Spanish racing cyclist.
Mamnoon Hussain, 80, Pakistani politician, governor of Sindh (1999) and president (2013–2018), cancer.
Muhammad Muhsin Khan, 93, Pakistani Islamic scholar and translator (Noble Quran).
Jeff LaBar, 58, American rock guitarist (Cinderella, Naked Beggars).
Julian L. Lapides, 89, American politician, member of the Maryland House of Delegates (1963–1967) and Senate (1967–1994), cancer.
Helen Lieros, 80, Zimbabwean visual artist.
Ken Ronaldson, 75, Scottish footballer (Aberdeen, Bristol Rovers, Gillingham).
Ricki Wertz, 86, American actress and television personality (Ricki & Copper).
Kurt Westergaard, 86, Danish cartoonist (Jyllands-Posten Muhammad cartoons controversy).

15
Robert Abirached, 90, Lebanese-born French writer and theatrologist.
Keith Bambridge, 85, English footballer (Rotherham United, Darlington, Halifax Town).
Mars Kadiombo Yamba Bilonda, 63, Congolese actor and screenwriter.
Rosario Casado, 60, Spanish pharmacist and politician, senator (2004–2008).
Germán Castro Caycedo, 81, Colombian journalist (El Tiempo) and writer, pancreatic cancer.
Libero De Rienzo, 44, Italian actor (Miele, La macchinazione, I Can Quit Whenever I Want), director and screenwriter, accidental drug overdose.
Absattar Derbisali, 73, Kazakhstani Islamic cleric, supreme mufti (2000–2013).
Ebrahim Desai, 58, South African mufti.
Andy Fordham, 59, English darts player, world champion (2004), organ failure.
Harry Gayfer, 95, Australian politician, Western Australia MLA (1962–1974) and Western Australian Legislative Council (1974–1989).
Yves Goussebaire-Dupin, 90, French politician, mayor of Dax (1977–1995) and senator (1983–1992).
Yoel Kahn, 91, Russian-born American Chabad rabbi.
Godefroid Mana Kangudie, 67, Congolese writer, professor, and theologian, COVID-19.
Judith Keating, 64, Canadian politician, senator (since 2020).
Jean Kraft, 94, American mezzo-soprano.
Jerry Lewis, 86, American politician, member of the California State Assembly (1969–1978) and U.S. House of Representatives (1979–2013), chair of the appropriations committee (2005–2007).
Pyotr Mamonov, 70, Russian rock musician (Zvuki Mu), COVID-19.
Gerda Mayer, 94, Czech-born English poet.
Dennis Murphy, 94, American sports entrepreneur, co-founder of the American Basketball Association and World Hockey Association, heart failure.
Mike Mullally, 82, American college athletics administrator (Eastern Illinois Panthers, Cal State Fullerton Titans, Boise State Broncos).
Mohamed Nafa, 82, Israeli politician, member of the Knesset (1990–1992).
William F. Nolan, 93, American author (Logan's Run) and screenwriter (Trilogy of Terror, Burnt Offerings).
Jaroslav Paška, 67, Slovak politician, three-time member of the National Council, MEP (2009–2014).
James Polk, 83, American journalist (The Washington Star).
Gloria Richardson, 99, American civil rights activist (Cambridge movement).
Gira Sarabhai, 98, Indian architect, co-founder of NID.
Sergio Silvagni, 83, Australian footballer (Carlton).
Hugo F. Sonnenschein, 80, American economist (Sonnenschein–Mantel–Debreu theorem).
Sugiharto, 66, Indonesian politician, minister of state owned enterprises (2004–2007), COVID-19.
Mikel Unzalu, 65, Spanish politician, general secretary of Euskadiko Ezkerra (1984–1991) and member of the Basque Parliament (2009–2016).
Peter R. de Vries, 64, Dutch investigative journalist and crime reporter (Peter R. de Vries: Crime Reporter), complications from gunshot wounds.
Bruce Watt, 82, New Zealand rugby union player (Canterbury, national team).
Doris Willens, 96, American folk singer-songwriter (The Baby Sitters) and journalist.
Peter Wynne-Thomas, 86, English cricket writer and historian.

16
Anthony Adams, 80, Australian-American optometrist.
Ibrahim Aliyu, 74, Nigerian general, military administrator of Jigawa State (1993–1996).
Biz Markie, 57, American rapper ("Just a Friend") and actor (Men in Black II, Yo Gabba Gabba!), complications from diabetes.
Yves Boutet, 84, French footballer (Stade Rennais, Lorient).
Doug Bennett, 75, American politician, member of the Michigan House of Representatives (2005–2010), traffic collision.
Simon Dring, 76, British journalist (Reuters, The Daily Telegraph, BBC News) and television presenter, heart attack.
Roger Fauroux, 94, French politician, mayor of Saint-Girons, Ariège (1989–1995).
Desmond Fennell, 92, Irish writer, philosopher, and linguist.
Finbarr Gantley, 70, Irish hurler (St. Gabriel's, Beagh, Galway).
José María Gay de Liébana, 68, Spanish economist, lawyer and academic, cancer.
Charles Gomis, 80, Ivorian diplomat, minister of foreign affairs (2000), ambassador to the United States (1986–1994) and France (2013–2020), vice president of the Senate (since 2020).
Stephen Hickman, 72, American illustrator.
Jean-Marie Lang, 78, French doctor and professor.
Akira Miyawaki, 93, Japanese botanist, cerebral hemorrhage.
Pablo Pérez Tremps, 64, Spanish jurist and academic, member of the Constitutional Court (2004–2013).
Thomas Rajna, 92, Hungarian-born British pianist and composer (Seven Years in Tibet, Jet Storm).
Jorge Romero Romero, 56, Mexican politician, deputy (2003–2006, 2009–2012).
Harry M. Rosenfeld, 91, American newspaper editor (The Washington Post), complications from COVID-19.
Hamid Reza Sadr, 65, Iranian football and film critic, cancer.
Danish Siddiqui, 38, Indian photojournalist (Reuters), Pulitzer Prize winner (2018), shot.
Surekha Sikri, 76, Indian actress (Kissa Kursi Ka, Tamas, Mammo), cardiac arrest.
Sultana Zafar, 66, Pakistani actress (Munkir, Ana, Tanhaiyaan).

17
Pilar Bardem, 82, Spanish actress (Good Morning, Little Countess, Nobody Will Speak of Us When We're Dead, The Doubt), Goya Award winner (1996), lung disease.
Jo Jo Barrett, 77, Irish Gaelic footballer (Austin Stacks, Kerry).
John Carney, 51, American politician, member of the Kentucky House of Representatives (since 2009).
Khurram Khan Chowdhury, 75, Bangladeshi politician, MP (1979–1986, 1988–1996, 2001–2008), COVID-19.
Dolores Claman, 94, Canadian composer ("The Hockey Theme"), complications from dementia.
George Curtis, 82, English football player (Coventry City, Aston Villa) and manager (Coventry City).
Louie Ehrensbeck, 76, American Olympic skier (1968).
George Forss, 80, American photographer, heart failure.
José Jaime Galeano, 75, Colombian Olympic cyclist (1968, 1976). (body discovered on this date)
Mat George, 26, American podcast host, traffic collision.
Williams Martínez, 38, Uruguayan footballer (Defensor Sporting, Cerro, national team), suicide.
Mohammed Milhim, 91, Palestinian politician, mayor of Halhul (1976–2004).
Angéline Nadié, 53, Ivorian actress (Ma Famille).
Valmiki Nayak, 69, Indian politician, Karnataka MLA (2009–2013), cardiac arrest.
Youssoupha Ndiaye, 83, Senegalese jurist and politician, president of the Court of Cassation (1992–1993) and Constitutional Council (1993–2002), minister of sport (2002–2005).
Marcel Queheille, 91, French road racing cyclist.
Powerscourt, 21, British-bred Irish Thoroughbred racehorse, heart attack. (death announced on this date)
Ellis Rainsberger, 88, American football player and coach (Kansas State Wildcats, Pittsburgh Maulers).
David Randall, 70, British journalist and editor (The Observer, The Independent).
Hermann von Richthofen, 87, German diplomat, ambassador to the United Kingdom (1989–1993).
Jacqueline Sassard, 81, French-Italian actress (March's Child, Women Are Weak, Accident).
Jim Shofner, 85, American football player (Cleveland Browns) and coach.
Aleksandr Starovoitov, 80, Russian security officer and academic, director of FAPSI (1991–1998).
Robby Steinhardt, 71, American singer and violinist (Kansas).
Eliaser Sunur, 58, Indonesian politician, regent of Lembata (2011–2016, since 2017), complications of COVID-19.
Sir Graham Vick, 67, English opera director, COVID-19.
Patricia Wilde, 93, Canadian-born American ballerina.
Milan Živadinović, 76, Serbian football player (Vardar, Rijeka, Crvenka) and manager.

18
Afaz Uddin Ahmed, 95, Bangladeshi politician, MP (2008–2014), COVID-19.
Jeff Barmby, 78, English footballer (York City, Goole Town, Scarborough).
Mumtaz Bhutto, 87, Pakistani politician, governor (1971–1972) and chief minister of Sindh (1972–1973).
Tommy Engstrand, 81, Swedish sports journalist and television host, COPD.
Lawrence Seymour Goodman, 100, British bomber pilot (No. 617 Squadron RAF).
Toby Goodman, 72, American politician, member of the Texas House of Representatives (1991–2007), heart attack.
Bernie Hansen, 76, American politician, member of the Chicago City Council (1983–2002).
Michel Husson, 72, French statistician and economist.
Bruce Kirby, 92, Canadian Olympic sailor (1956, 1964, 1968) and yacht designer.
Milan Lasica, 81, Slovak humorist, playwright, and actor, heart attack.
Antonio José López Castillo, 76, Venezuelan Roman Catholic prelate, archbishop of Barquisimeto (2007–2020) and Calabozo (2001–2007) and bishop of Barinas (1992–2001).
Jenny Lynn, 49, American bodybuilder, seizure.
Arturo Armando Molina, 93, Salvadoran politician and military officer, president (1972–1977).
Nurul Mustafa, 73, Bangladeshi computer scientist and academic administrator, vice-chancellor of Southern University (2016–2021).
Tom O'Connor, 81, British comedian and game show host (Crosswits, The Zodiac Game, Name That Tune), complications from Parkinson's disease.
Roger Quemener, 80, French racewalker.
James Earl Reid, 78, American sculptor (Statue of Billie Holiday), heart failure.
Carlos Seigelshifer, 92, Argentine Olympic weightlifter (1956).
Donal Sheehan, 81, Irish hurler (Na Piarsaigh).
Philip Sherry, 87, New Zealand newsreader and politician, deputy chairman of Auckland Regional Council.
A. Y. B. I. Siddiqi, 76, Bangladeshi diplomat and police officer, IGP (1998–2000).
David Snell, 87, English professional golfer. (death announced on this date)
Nenad Stekić, 70, Serbian Olympic long jumper (1976, 1980, 1984).
Enn Tarto, 82, Estonian dissident and politician, MP (1992–2003).
Paul D. Taylor, 82, American diplomat, ambassador to the Dominican Republic (1988–1992).
Gérard Théry, 88, French engineer and computer scientist.
John Woodcock, 94, English cricket writer.
Valerij Zhuravliov, 82, Latvian chess player.

19
Hans Booys, 69, Namibian politician, member of the National Assembly (1999–2010).
Kurt Clemens, 95, German footballer (1. FC Saarbrücken, FC Nancy, Saarland national team).
Danza, 10, American racehorse and sire. (death announced on this date)
Juan Carlos Del Bello, 70, Argentine academic, director of INDEC (2002–2003) and rector of the National University of Río Negro (since 2008), heart attack.
Layne Flack, 52, American poker player.
Lynn Franklin, 74, American writer, metastatic breast cancer.
José Siro González Bacallao, 90, Cuban Roman Catholic prelate, bishop of Pinar del Río (1984–2006).
Derek Huggins, 80, English-born Zimbabwean artist.
Kim Hong-bin, 56, South Korean mountain climber, fall.
Noel Lucey, 82, Irish Gaelic footballer (Glenbeigh-Glencar, Laune Rangers, Mid Kerry).
David Lunn, 91, British bishop, Bishop of Sheffield (1980–1997).
Paratene Matchitt, 88, New Zealand artist.
Iván Noel, 52, Lebanese-born French-Argentine film director (En tu ausencia) and producer, suicide.
Lito Osmeña, 82, Filipino politician, governor of Cebu (1988–1992), COVID-19.
K. Sankaranarayana Pillai, 75, Indian politician, Kerala MLA (1982–1987) and minister of transport (1987–1991), heart attack.
Abel Ramírez Águilar, 78, Mexican sculptor.
Jacques Rougeot, 83, French literary critic and political activist, co-founder and president of the Union Nationale Inter-universitaire (1969–2009).
Mohammed Sabila, 79, Moroccan writer and philosopher, COVID-19.
Raymond Savard, 94, Canadian politician, MP (1977–1984) and mayor of Verdun, Quebec (1985–1993).
Simon Terry, 47, British archer, Olympic bronze medalist (1992), cancer.
Tolis Voskopoulos, 80, Greek singer and actor (Marijuana Stop!, Agonia).
Mary Ward, 106, Australian actress (Prisoner, Sons and Daughters, Neighbours).
Chuck E. Weiss, 76, American songwriter and vocalist, inspiration for "Chuck E.'s in Love", cancer.
Win Approval, 29, American Thoroughbred racehorse, euthanized.
William S. Yellow Robe Jr., 59, American Assiniboine playwright, director, and lecturer.

20
Vita Andersen, 78, Danish poet and author.
Françoise Arnoul, 90, French actress (French Cancan, The Devil and the Ten Commandments, Forbidden Fruit).
Sikkil R. Bhaskaran, 85, Indian violinist.
James H. Bramble, 90, American mathematician.
Dinos Constantinides, 92, Greek-American composer.
Henri Deluy, 90, French poet.
Daniel Escudero, 79, Chilean footballer (Everton, Unión La Calera, San Luis de Quillota).
Ernst Fasan, 94, Austrian lawyer.
Inge Ginsberg, 99, Austrian-Swiss author and singer, heart failure.
Jerry Granelli, 80, American-born Canadian jazz drummer (A Charlie Brown Christmas).
Pierre Guitton, 77, French painter and comic book author (Charlie Mensuel, Hara-Kiri).
Curt-Eric Holmquist, 73, Swedish conductor (Lotta på Liseberg), Eurovision Song Contest winner (1984), leukemia.
Ron Howard, 67, American politician, member of the Kansas House of Representatives (since 2019).
Theo Jubitana, 56, Surinamese administrator and politician, COVID-19.
David Leckie, 70, Australian media executive (Seven West Media).
Chuck McMann, 70, Canadian football player (Montreal Alouettes) and coach (BC Lions, McGill Redmen).
Giorgos Messalas, 78, Greek actor (I Loved an Armchair).
Anita Novinsky, 98, Polish-born Brazilian historian.
Nyan Win, 78, Burmese politician, MP (since 1990), COVID-19.
Brian O'Halloran, 83, Australian footballer (North Melbourne).
Roger Owen, 67, Welsh rugby player (Llanelli RFC, St Helens R.F.C., national team).
Alastair Paterson, 97, British engineer, president of the Institution of Structural Engineers (1984–1985) and of the Institution of Civil Engineers (1988–1989).
Ruth Pearl, 85, Israeli-American software developer.
André Petit, 99, French politician, deputy (1978–1981).
Billy Reid, 83, Scottish footballer (Motherwell, Airdrie).
Elmo Rodrigopulle, 80, Sri Lankan sports journalist.
Noureddine Saâdi, 71, Algerian football manager (JS Kabylie, Al Ahli Tripoli, ASO Chlef), COVID-19.
Louisette Texier, 108, Armenian-French resistant and racecar driver.
Bergen Williams, 62, American actress (General Hospital), complications from Wilson's disease.
Peter Willis, 83, English football referee.

21
Alexander McDonnell, 9th Earl of Antrim, 86, Northern Irish peer.
Lieb Bester, 72, South African musician and actor (The Making of the Mahatma, Stander, Winnie Mandela), COVID-19.
Claude Bonin-Pissarro, 100, French painter and graphic designer.
Rita Brantalou, 73, French actor and musician (Au Bonheur des Dames).
Jack Cable, 86, Canadian politician, Yukon MLA (1992–2000) and commissioner of Yukon (2000–2005).
Paula Caplan, 74, American psychologist.
Binoy Kumar Dewan, 96, Bangladeshi politician, MP (1986–1990).
Awa Diop, 73, Senegalese politician, deputy (since 1990).
Aleksander Eelmaa, 74, Estonian actor (Ruudi, A Friend of Mine, Õnne 13).
Sekul Islam, 71–72, Bangladeshi engineer and academic administrator, vice-chancellor of Atish Dipankar University of Science and Technology (since 2017), cardiac arrest.
Siân James, 90, Welsh novelist (A Small Country).
Alberto Giraldo Jaramillo, 86, Colombian Roman Catholic prelate, archbishop of Medellín (1997–2010).
Jean-Pierre Jaussaud, 84, French racing driver, heart attack.
Chunni Lal Khetrapal, 83, Indian chemical physicist, vice-chancellor of the University of Allahabad (1998–2001).
Tommy Leishman, 83, Scottish footballer (Liverpool, Stranraer, St Mirren).
Janardan Manjhi, 78, Indian politician, Bihar MLA (since 2010).
Clarence McDonald, 76, American pianist, composer and producer, cancer.
Stan McKenzie, 76, American basketball player (Baltimore Bullets, Portland Trail Blazers).
Noor Mukadam, 27, Jordanian-born Pakistani torture victim, decapitation.
Uttam Nepali, 84, Nepali visual artist and writer, heart failure.
Arif Nizami, 72, Pakistani journalist (Pakistan Today) and politician, caretaker minister of information & broadcasting (2013).
Desmond O'Malley, 82, Irish politician, TD (1968–2002) and minister for industry and commerce (1977–1981, 1989–1992).
Aleksandr Smirnov, 63, Russian politician, vice-governor of Saint Petersburg (2000–2003), deputy (2012–2016), COVID-19.
Mike Smith, 83, English football player (Corinthian Casuals) and manager (Wales national team, Egypt national team).
Juan Vital Sourrouille, 80, Argentine politician and economist, minister of economy (1985–1989), colorectal cancer.

22
Bhageerathi Amma, 107, Indian centenarian student.
Andrew Barker, 78, British classicist and academic.
Vladimir Bogdashin, 69, Russian naval officer, COVID-19.
Boris Chochiev, 63, South Ossetian politician, prime minister (2008), COVID-19.
Ann Marie Flynn, 82, American Olympic high jumper (1956).
C. Stuart Houston, 93, American-born Canadian physician and radiologist.
John Hsane Hgyi, 67, Burmese Roman Catholic prelate, bishop of Pathein (since 2003), COVID-19.
Greg Knapp, 58, American football coach (New York Jets, Atlanta Falcons), injuries from traffic collision.
Jean-Yves Lafesse, 64, French humorist and actor, complications from amyotrophic lateral sclerosis.
Michèle Lalonde, 83, Canadian writer and poet.
Armando Larios Jiménez, 70, Colombian Roman Catholic prelate, bishop of Riohacha (2001–2004) and Magangué (1994–2001).
Gary Leif, 64, American politician, member of the Oregon House of Representatives (since 2018), cancer.
Dan Logue, 70, American politician, member of the California State Assembly (2008–2014).
Gopal Mayekar, 87, Indian writer and politician, Goa MLA (1967–1972) and MP (1989–1991).
Anna Mghwira, 62, Tanzanian politician, Kilimanjaro Regional Commissioner (2017–2021).
Nityananda Misra, 92, Indian politician, MP (1980–1989).
Howard Morgan, 91, American weather forecaster and artist.
Christa Mulack, 77, German feminist theologian and author.
Peter Neusel, 79, German rower, Olympic champion (1964).
K. T. S. Padannayil, 88, Indian actor (Three Men Army, The Godman, Amar Akbar Anthony).
Ian Palmer, 55, South African football player (Orlando Pirates) and manager (Chippa United), complications from COVID-19.
Palo Pandolfo, 56, Argentine singer-songwriter and musician (Don Cornelio y la Zona).
Rod Preece, 81, British-Canadian political philosopher and historian.
Peter Rehberg, 53, Austrian-British electronic musician (KTL), heart attack.
Şevket Sabancı, 85, Turkish industrial and financial entrepreneur (Sabancı Holding).
*Saw Mo Shay, 53, Burmese insurgent, commander-in-chief of the DKBA-5 (since 2016), COVID-19.
Robert Shaw, 83, American politician, member of the Chicago City Council (1979–1983, 1987–1998), commissioner of the Cook County Board of Review (1998–2004), colon cancer.
Guillermo Sucre, 88, Venezuelan poet, essayist, and literary critic.
Tim Talton, 82, American baseball player (Kansas City Athletics).
Andre Thysse, 52, South African boxer, COVID-19.
Hikmat Singh Verma, 65, Fijian politician, MP (1999–2000), COVID-19.
Zentaro Watanabe, 57, Japanese musician and music producer, pancreatic cancer.
Christianto Wibisono, 75, Indonesian economist, COVID-19.

23
Fakir Alamgir, 71, Bangladeshi folk singer, COVID-19.
Alfred Biolek, 87, German entertainer and television producer (Bio's Bahnhof, Monty Python's Fliegender Zirkus).
Ho-Kau Chan, 89, Hong Kong Cantonese opera singer and actress, cancer.
John Cornell, 80, Australian film producer, writer (Crocodile Dundee, Crocodile Dundee II) and actor (The Paul Hogan Show), complications from Parkinson's disease.
Sam Domoni, 52, Fijian rugby player (London Irish, Saracens, national team) and coach.
Jabbour Douaihy, 71, Lebanese novelist.
Marilyn Evans-Jones, 92, American politician, member of the Florida House of Representatives (1976–1986).
Wally Gonzalez, 71, Filipino blues guitarist (Juan de la Cruz Band).
F. C. Gundlach, 95, German photographer.
Michel Guyard, 85, French Roman Catholic prelate, bishop of Le Havre (2003–2011).
Andy Higgins, 61, English footballer (Chester City, Port Vale, Rochdale).
Jimmy Demianus Ijie, 53, Indonesian politician, MP (since 2019), COVID-19.
Patricia Kennealy-Morrison, 75, American novelist (The Keltiad) and journalist (Jazz & Pop).
Mahmoud Khedri, 73, Algerian politician, member of the People's National Assembly (1997–2003) and minister of industry (2005–2007), COVID-19.
Tito Lupini, 65, South African-born Italian rugby union player (Rovigo, Italy national team) and coach, COVID-19.
David Lust, 53, American politician, member of the South Dakota House of Representatives (2007–2015, 2016–2019), heart attack.
Toshihide Maskawa, 81, Japanese physicist (Cabibbo–Kobayashi–Maskawa matrix), Nobel Prize winner (2008), mandibular cancer.
Piers Plowright, 83, British radio producer, cancer.
David W. Preus, 99, American Lutheran minister, complications from heart failure.
Klaus Wilhelm Roggenkamp, 80, German mathematician.
Claude Rouer, 91, French racing cyclist, Olympic bronze medalist (1952).
Willem van 't Spijker, 94, Dutch minister and theologian.
Maurice Taieb, 86, Tunisian-born French geologist and paleoanthropologist.
Nicola Tranfaglia, 82, Italian historian and politician, deputy (2006–2008).
Peter Trueman, 86, Canadian journalist (Global Television Network, CBC News).
Miguel Ángel Virasoro, 81, Argentine physicist (Virasoro algebra).
Steven Weinberg, 88, American theoretical physicist, Nobel Prize laureate (1979).
Tuomo Ylipulli, 56, Finnish ski jumper, Olympic champion (1988).

24
Rodney Alcala, 77, American serial killer.
Alain Barrau, 74, French politician, deputy (1986–1993, 1997–2002), mayor of Béziers (1989–1995), cerebrovascular disease.
Jahanara Begum, 79, Bangladeshi politician, MP (1991–1996), cardiac arrest.
Dieter Brummer, 45, Australian actor (Home and Away, Neighbours, Underbelly: The Golden Mile), suicide.
Arthur French, 89, American actor (Car Wash, Malcolm X, Movie 43).
Bernard de Kerraoul, 85, French writer.
Satish Kalsekar, 78, Indian poet and essayist, heart attack.
Herbert Köfer, 100, German actor (Reserved for the Death, Naked Among Wolves, Hands Up or I'll Shoot).
Kenzie MacNeil, 68, Canadian songwriter, producer and director.
Mac Makarchuk, 91, Canadian politician, Ontario MPP (1967–1971, 1975–1981).
Rubén Martínez Puente, 79, Cuban military officer (Cuban Revolutionary Armed Forces) and politician, member of the National Assembly of People's Power (2008–2013).
Jackie Mason, 93, American comedian and actor (The Simpsons, The Jerk, Caddyshack II), Emmy winner (1988, 1992).
Kaarel Orviku, 86, Estonian marine geologist and photographer.
Elly Pamatong, 78, Filipino lawyer and politician, cardiac arrest.
Ed Patenaude, 71, Canadian ice hockey player (Edmonton Oilers, Indianapolis Racers).
Virgílio Pereira, 80, Portuguese professor and politician, mayor of Funchal (1974–1983, 1994), deputy (1983–1986), and MEP (1986–1994).
Sue Pinnington, 55, British Anglican priest.
Yevgeni Pupkov, 45, Kazakhstani ice hockey player (Kazzinc-Torpedo, SKA Saint Petersburg, Khimik Voskresensk) and coach, COVID-19.
Antoni Rajkiewicz, 99, Polish politician and economist, minister of labor, salary and social policy (1981–1982).
Marco Antonio Raupp, 83, Brazilian mathematician and politician, minister of science, technology and innovation (2012–2014), acute respiratory failure.
Romeu, 73, Spanish comics artist, co-founder of El Jueves.
Pitaloosie Saila, 79, Canadian Inuk artist.
Alfie Scopp, 101, English-born Canadian actor (Tales of the Wizard of Oz, Fiddler on the Roof, Rudolph the Red-Nosed Reindeer).
Naha Mint Seyyidi, Mauritanian journalist.
Dale Snodgrass, 72, American aviator, plane crash.
Noel Swerdlow, 79, American science historian.
Johnny Young, 81, American diplomat, ambassador to Togo (1994–1997), Bahrain (1997–2001) and Slovenia (2001–2004), pancreatic cancer.
Viktor Zheliandinov, 86, Ukrainian chess player and coach, International Master (1962).

25
Andy Carswell, 98, Canadian RCAF pilot.
Otelo Saraiva de Carvalho, 84, Portuguese military officer, chief strategist of the Carnation Revolution and leader of Forças Populares 25 de Abril, heart failure.
Philip Chatfield, 93, British-born New Zealand ballet dancer and choreographer.
Phil Coleman, 90, American Olympic long-distance runner (1956, 1960).
Alvin Duskin, 90, American clothing manufacturer and political activist.
Doug Falconer, 69, Canadian football player (Ottawa Rough Riders, Calgary Stampeders) and film producer (Forsaken).
Colin Forbes, 88, Australian rugby union player (national team).
R. Ilankumaranar, 94, Indian Tamil scholar.
Jean-François Istasse, 70, Belgian politician, Walloon deputy (1995–2014, 2018–2019).
Abdul Kalim, 51, Fijian lawn bowler.
Phil Lambert, 71, Australian television personality (Hey Hey It's Saturday).
Bob Moses, 86, American civil rights activist (SNCC), co-founder of the Mississippi Freedom Democratic Party.
Helen Nicol, 101, American baseball player (Kenosha Comets, Rockford Peaches).
Eddy Posthuma de Boer, 90, Dutch photographer.
R. Rajamahendran, 78, Sri Lankan media personality and businessman.
Anni Rättyä, 87, Finnish Olympic javelin thrower (1952).
Robert K. Ritner, 68, American Egyptologist.
Rosine Vieyra Soglo, 87, Beninese politician, first lady (1991–1996), member of the Pan-African Parliament (2004–2009), MNA (1999–2019).
Henri Vernes, 102, Belgian author (Bob Morane).
Erika Vollmer, 96, German tennis player.
Jing Wang, 71, Taiwanese media scientist, founder of NGO2.0, heart attack.
Robert G. Yerks, 92, American lieutenant general.

26
Rick Aiello, 65, American actor (Twin Peaks: Fire Walk with Me, Do the Right Thing, The Sopranos), pancreatic cancer.
Cliff Anderson, 76, American basketball player (Los Angeles Lakers, Philadelphia 76ers, Cleveland Cavaliers), respiratory failure.
Albert Bandura, 95, Canadian-American psychologist, heart failure.
Július Binder, 89, Slovak engineer and politician, deputy (1998–2002).
Aaron L. Brody, 90, American food scientist, complications from Alzheimer's disease.
Wiktor Bukato, 72, Polish translator and publisher.
Eric Carter, 101, British RAF pilot.
Alfred Chupin, 104, French politician, mayor of Brest (1947–1953), deputy (1951–1955).
William Clutz, 88, American artist.
George De Peana, 85, Guyanese Olympic long-distance runner (1960) and trade union leader.
Brazo de Plata, 58, Mexican professional wrestler (CMLL, WWE), heart attack.
Ally Dawson, 63, Scottish football player (Rangers, Blackburn Rovers, Airdrie) and manager.
Mike Enzi, 77, American politician, senator (1997–2021), mayor of Gillette, Wyoming (1975–1983), injuries sustained in traffic collision.
Louise Fishman, 82, American abstract artist.
Nikos Fokas, 94, Greek poet and essayist.
Kåre Gjønnes, 79, Norwegian politician, minister of agriculture (1997–2000) and Nordic cooperation (2000).
Bernardo Guerra Serna, 90, Colombian politician, member (1982–1986) and president (1982–1983) of the Senate.
Natty Hollmann, 82, Argentine philanthropist, COVID-19.
Mike Howe, 55, American heavy metal singer (Metal Church, Heretic), suicide by hanging.
Jayanthi, 76, Indian actress (Jenu Goodu, Miss Leelavathi, Edhir Neechal).
René Juárez Cisneros, 65, Mexican economist and politician, governor of Guerrero (1999–2005), president of the PRI (2018), and deputy (since 2018), COVID-19.
Joey Jordison, 46, American musician (Slipknot, Murderdolls, Sinsaenum).
Fernando Karadima, 90, Chilean Roman Catholic priest and convicted child abuser (Karadima case), bronchopneumonia and kidney failure.
Dewey Lambdin, 76, American author.
Gilbert Levin, 97, American engineer, aortic dissection.
Lee Man Tat, 91, Hong Kong food manufacturer, chairman of Lee Kum Kee (since 1972).
Ulla Nævestad, 75, Norwegian politician, MP (1989–1993), mayor of Lier (1995–2011).
Elad Peled, 93, Israeli military officer.
Mário Ribeiro, 86, Portuguese Olympic sport shooter (1972).
Dídac Pestaña Rodríguez, 63, Spanish politician, mayor of Gavà (1985–2005) and member of the Parliament of Catalonia (2010).
Gogó Rojo, 78, Argentine vedette and actress (Cry Chicago, Hay que romper la rutina), cardiorespiratory arrest.
Grethe Rostbøll, 80, Danish politician, minister for culture (1990–1993) and MP (1995, 1996–1998).
David Sampson, 76, English rugby league footballer (Wakefield Trinity, Bramley, Castleford).
Joseph P. Smith, 55, American convicted murderer.
Sir Colin Southgate, 83, English businessman, heart attack.
Josef Steffes-Mies, 81, German Olympic rower (1964).
Joe Taffoni, 76, American football player (Cleveland Browns, New York Giants), lymphoma.
Ivan Toplak, 89, Serbian football player (Red Star Belgrade) and manager (Oakland Clippers, Yugoslavia national team).
André Tubeuf, 90, French writer, philosopher, and music critic.
David Von Ancken, 56, American film and television director (Seraphim Falls, Tut, The Vampire Diaries), stomach cancer.

27
Menchu Álvarez del Valle, 93, Spanish radio journalist.
Sergio Asti, 95, Italian designer and architect.
Meriem Belmihoub, 86, Algerian independence fighter and lawyer.
Rawle Brancker, 83, Barbadian cricketer (national team).
Jack Carlisle, 91, American college football coach (East Tennessee State Buccaneers).
LeRoy Clarke, 82, Trinidadian artist and poet.
Tommy Connolly, 74, Irish football player (Dundalk) and manager.
Orlando Drummond, 101, Brazilian actor (Escolinha do Professor Raimundo), voice artist and comedian, multiple organ failure.
Pete George, 92, American weightlifter, Olympic champion (1952).
José Arthur Giannotti, 91, Brazilian philosopher.
Saginaw Grant, 85, American Sac and Fox actor (The Lone Ranger, The Ridiculous 6).
Tony Guillory, 78, American football player (Los Angeles Rams, Philadelphia Eagles).
Mo Hayder, 59, British actress (Are You Being Served?) and author (Birdman, Pig Island), complications from motor neurone disease.
Jack Hedley, 91, Australian footballer (North Melbourne, Camberwell).
Mike Hendrick, 72, English cricketer (Nottinghamshire, Derbyshire, national team), cancer.
Phillip King, 87, British sculptor.
Einar Bruno Larsen, 81, Norwegian footballer (Vålerenga, national team) and Olympic ice hockey player (1964).
Rudi Leavor, 95, German-born British community activist and Holocaust survivor.
Ning Li, 78, American physicist.
Ray McBride, 69, Irish actor (Into the West, Pete's Meteor, Angela's Ashes) and dancer.
Stefan Michnik, 91, Polish military judge and officer in Polish People's Army.
Nada Milošević-Đorđević, 86, Serbian literary historian and academic.
Gianni Nazzaro, 72, Italian singer and actor (Ma che musica maestro, Scandalo in famiglia, Impotenti esistenziali), lung cancer.
Orestes Ojeda, 65, Filipino actor (Zoom, Zoom, Superman!, Manila by Night, Rosa Mistica), pancreatic cancer.
Jan Pęczek, 70, Polish actor (Barwy szczęścia), bone marrow cancer.
Jerry Pickard, 80, Canadian politician, MP (1988–2006).
Enrique Planchart, 84, Venezuelan mathematician and academic, rector of Simón Bolívar University (since 2009).
C. S. Reuter, 93, American politician, member of the Florida Senate (1967–1971), complications from Parkinson's disease.
Zalika Souley, 73, Nigerien actress (Le Retour d'un aventurier, Cabascabo).
Jean-François Stévenin, 77, French actor (The Dogs of War, Cold Moon, Sushi Sushi).
Ellen Havre Weis, 64, American historian, brain cancer.
Wen Shizhen, 81, Chinese politician, governor of Liaoning (1994–1998).
Hal Wootten, 98, Australian judge and academic, puisne judge of the Supreme Court of New South Wales (1973–1983).
Gérard Zingg, 79, French painter and film director (At Night All Cats Are Crazy).

28
Khorshed Alam, 86, Bangladeshi economist, governor of Bangladesh Bank (1992–1996).
Bolat Atabaev, 69, Kazakhstani theater director.
Oleg Baklanov, 89, Russian politician, minister of general machine building (1983–1988).
Léonel Beaudoin, 96, Canadian politician, MP (1968–1979).
Porfirio Armando Betancourt, 63, Honduran footballer (Strasbourg, Marathón, national team), COVID-19.
Roberto Calasso, 80, Italian writer and publisher (Adelphi Edizioni).
André Catimba, 74, Brazilian footballer (Ypiranga, Vitória, Grêmio).
Wade Cook, 71, American author.
István Csom, 81, Hungarian chess Grandmaster (1973) and International Arbiter.
Volodymyr Dykyi, 59, Ukrainian football player (Karpaty Lviv, Nyva Ternopil) and manager (Volyn Lutsk).
Satsuki Eda, 80, Japanese politician, MP (1977–2019) and minister of justice (2011).
Glen Ford, 71, American journalist, cancer.
Nancy Frankel, 92, American sculptor, homicide by suffocation.
Giuseppe Giacomini, 80, Italian operatic tenor.
Dusty Hill, 72, American Hall of Fame musician (ZZ Top) and songwriter ("Tush").
Tamara Kamenszain, 74, Argentine poet, writer and cultural manager, cancer.
Krzysztof Karpiński, 67, Polish footballer (Śląsk Wrocław).
Shahram Kashani, 47, Iranian pop singer, COVID-19.
Ted Lewin, 86, American author and illustrator.
Dick Long, 97, Australian politician, Victoria MLC (1973–1992).
Malcolm McCaw, 91, New Zealand cricketer (Wellington).
Bent Melchior, 92, Danish religious leader, chief rabbi of Denmark (1969–1996), heart attack.
Linn F. Mollenauer, 84, American physicist.
Nandu Natekar, 88, Indian badminton player.
Lewis Petrinovich, 91, American evolutionary psychologist.
Barbara Połomska, 87, Polish actress (Shadow, Eroica, The Eighth Day of the Week).
Ron Popeil, 86, American inventor and businessman (Ronco).
Ruben Radica, 90, Croatian composer.
J. W. Rinzler, 58, American film historian and author (Star Wars), pancreatic cancer.
Syed Abdus Samad, 79, Bangladeshi academic.
Clive Scott, 84, South African actor (My Way, Beat the Drum, Winnie Mandela).
Derek Tomkinson, 90, English footballer (Port Vale, Macclesfield Town, Crewe Alexandra).
Johnny Ventura, 81, Dominican merengue and salsa musician, mayor of Santo Domingo (1998–2002) and deputy (1982–1986), heart attack.
Ben Wagin, 91, German artist.
Michael Zachries, 77, German sailor, Olympic bronze medallist (1976).

29
Janet Banana, 83, Zimbabwean teacher, first lady (1980–1987), kidney failure.
Nery Cano, 66, Guatemalan trumpet player, conductor, and composer. (death announced on this date)
Jaime Chamorro Cardenal, 86, Nicaraguan journalist (La Prensa) and guerrilla.
Michel Egloff, 80, Swiss prehistorian and archeologist.
Robert Dove, 82, American politician and academic, parliamentarian of the U.S. Senate (1981–1987, 1995–2001).
Anima Guha, 89, Indian writer.
Thomas Joseph, 67, Indian writer.
Richard Lamm, 85, American politician, governor of Colorado (1975–1987), complications from pulmonary embolism.
John Landon, 71, American politician, member of the Iowa House of Representatives (since 2013).
Carl Levin, 87, American politician, senator (1979–2015).
Jon Lindbergh, 88, American underwater diver.
Min Yu Wai, 92, Burmese writer, COVID-19.
Janice Mirikitani, 80, American poet and political activist.
Gary B. Nash, 88, American historian, colon cancer.
Susan Reynolds, 92, British medieval historian.
Kaare Sandegren, 92, Norwegian trade unionist.
Armen Shekoyan, 68, Armenian writer and poet.
Lin-J Shell, 39, American football player (Orlando Predators, Toronto Argonauts, BC Lions).
Raymond Ken'ichi Tanaka, 93, Japanese Roman Catholic prelate, bishop of Kyoto (1976–1997).
Mauro Testa, 74, Italian Olympic sailor (1972).
Baroness Tuputupu Vaea, 92, Tongan royal.
Albert Vanhoye, 98, French Roman Catholic cardinal, rector of the Pontifical Biblical Institute (1984–1990).
Brodie Westen, 89, American football coach (Western Illinois Leathernecks).
Zizinho, 59, Brazilian footballer (Club América, Club Necaxa, Monterrey), COVID-19.

30
Ali Ashraf, 73, Bangladeshi politician, MP (1973–1979, since 2008).
Frank Ashworth, 94, Canadian ice hockey player (Chicago Blackhawks).
Bernardini, 18, American Thoroughbred racehorse, Preakness Stakes winner, euthanized.
Roger Boore, 82, Welsh writer and publisher.
Michel Chalhoub, 89, Syrian-born French luxury retailer, founder of the Chalhoub Group.
Hüseyin Avni Coş, 62, Turkish politician, governor of Sakarya Province (2014–2017).
Jack Couffer, 96, American cinematographer (Jonathan Livingston Seagull).
Daniel Delgado, 73, Panamanian lawyer, military officer and politician, minister of government and justice (2007–2008).
Ganpatrao Deshmukh, 93, Indian politician, Maharashtra MLA (1962–1972, 1978–1995, 1999–2019).
Elaine Duillo, 93, American painter and illustrator.
Guy Eby, 102, American airline captain.
Shona Ferguson, 47, South African actor (Generations, Isidingo, Muvhango) and producer, COVID-19.
Henock ya Kasita, 68, Namibian politician, MP (1993–2010).
Veno Kauaria, 60, Namibian politician, MP (since 2020).
John Lord, 84, Australian footballer (Melbourne).
Ambilikile Mwasapile, 86, Tanzanian Lutheran priest and healer.
Manuel Morato, 87, Filipino government official, chairman of the MTRCB (1986–1992), COVID-19.
Rachel Oniga, 64, Nigerian actress (Sango, Doctor Bello, 30 Days in Atlanta).
Jay Pickett, 60, American actor (Rush Week, Rumpelstiltskin, Port Charles), heart attack.
Lasha Pipia, 45, Russian judoka.
Richard Reicheg, 84, American actor and songwriter.
Veno Kauaria, 60, Namibian politician, MP (since 2020), complications from COVID-19.
Abdul Khaliq Sambhali, 71, Indian Islamic scholar.
Martha Sánchez Néstor, 47, Mexican Indigenous human and women's rights activist, COVID-19.
Curt Stone, 98, American Olympic long-distance runner (1948, 1952, 1956).
Monique Thierry, 81, French actress (The New Adventures of Vidocq).
Johan van Zyl, South African businessman, chairman of Toyota Motor Europe (2015–2021), COVID-19.
Italo Vassallo, 80, Ethiopian footballer (Cotton Factory Club, national team).
Thea White, 81, American voice actress (Courage the Cowardly Dog), complications from liver surgery.
Hyacinth Wijeratne, 75, Sri Lankan actress (Kanyavi, Ho Gaana Pokuna), traffic collision.

31
Intisar Al-Sharrah, 58, Kuwaiti actress.
Herminio Aquino, 72, Filipino businessman and politician, member of the House of Representatives (1987–1998).
Angela Bailey, 59, Canadian sprinter, Olympic silver medalist (1984), cancer.
Josemith Bermúdez, 41, Venezuelan actress and TV personality, ovarian cancer.
Paco Cabanes Pastor, 66, Spanish Valencian pilota player, cancer.
Chin Sian Thang, 83, Burmese politician, MP (1990–2010), COVID-19.
Charles Connor, 86, American drummer (Little Richard).
Terry Cooper, 77, English football player (Leeds United, national team) and manager (Bristol City).
Paul Cotton, 78, American musician (Poco, Illinois Speed Press) and songwriter ("Heart of the Night").
Royce Flippin, 87, American college football player (Princeton Tigers).
Alvin Ing, 89, American singer and actor (The Final Countdown, Stir Crazy, The Gambler), COVID-19.
Kenneth Johansson, 65, Swedish politician, MP (1998–2012).
Man Kaur, 105, Indian masters track and field athlete, heart attack.
Jerzy Matuszkiewicz, 93, Polish jazz musician (Melomani), bandleader and film score composer.
Jean-Claude Kazembe Musonda, 58, Congolese politician, governor of Haut-Katanga Province (2016–2017).
Isaac Ngahane, 66, Cameroonian politician, deputy (2002–2021).
Thomas Nicholls, 89, English featherweight boxer, Olympic silver medalist (1956).
Martin Perscheid, 55, German cartoonist, cancer.
Jalal Sattari, 89, Iranian mythologist, writer, and translator.
Mark Tarlov, 69, American film producer (Christine, Copycat), director (Simply Irresistible) and winemaker, cancer.
Aloys Wobben, 69, German wind turbine manufacturer, founder of Enercon.
Ronald C. Wornick, 89, American food scientist.
Jacobus Frederick van Wyk, 69, South African politician, member of the National Assembly (1997–2004), complications from COVID-19.
Yeo Hyo-jin, 38, South Korean footballer (Gimcheon Sangmu, Tochigi SC, Goyang Zaicro), cancer.

References

2021-07
07